Money Jungle is a studio album by pianist Duke Ellington with double bassist Charles Mingus and drummer Max Roach. It was recorded on September 17, 1962, and released in February 1963 by United Artists Jazz. All but one of the compositions were written by Ellington, with four of the seven on the original LP being recorded for the first time on this album. Later releases on CD added eight tracks from the same recording session.

The album was reviewed positively at the time of its release and subsequent reviews have remained highly favorable. Negative comments have concentrated on differences in playing style among the three musicians, brought about by the generational gap between Ellington and the others, and an argument that led to Mingus leaving the studio mid-session. Hundreds of musicians have been influenced by the recording, in particular by the freedom of individual expression within a small-group setting.

Background
Producer Alan Douglas had helped Duke Ellington with errands when they were both working in Paris in the early 1960s. Later, after Douglas had joined United Artists and moved to New York, he received, according to his own account, a surprise visit from Ellington, who suggested recording a piano-based album (Ellington was known as a big band leader). Douglas suggested Charles Mingus as double bassist, who then insisted on having Max Roach as drummer. Mingus had played with Ellington before, deputising for the regular bassist in the leader's orchestra in 1953, but was fired after four days, following a fight with another musician, Juan Tizol.

At the time of the 1962 recording, Ellington was 63 years old, while Mingus was 40 and Roach 38. The generational difference was strengthened by Ellington being a guiding figure for the other two, who were born when Ellington was becoming an influence on music. In 1962, Ellington did not have a recording contract, while Mingus was signed to United Artists. According to Roach, the three musicians met the day before the recording, and Ellington told them to "Think of me as the poor man's Bud Powell" and that he would not like to play only his own material.

Recording and music
The recording was made on Monday, September 17, 1962, at Sound Makers Studios in New York City, on 57th Street, between Sixth Avenue and Seventh. The session was due to begin at 1 pm. Roach arrived at midday to set up his drums and found that Ellington was already there, writing out some material. Despite his suggestion the previous day, all of the compositions used were brought by Ellington. For each piece, according to Roach, he and Mingus were given "a lead sheet that just gave the basic melody and harmony", plus a visual image described by the pianist: one example was, "crawling around on the streets are serpents who have their heads up; these are agents and people who have exploited artists. Play that along with the music". The musicians had declined the chance to rehearse, so the recording, which was made on three-track tape, was of their first experience playing together.

Money Jungle is a post-bop album. The original LP contained seven tracks – six composed by Ellington, and one, "Caravan" by Juan Tizol, strongly associated with him. The title track is a 12-bar blues that opens with strongly played notes from Mingus, then Ellington joins in with dissonant chords; Roach supports using ride cymbal, snare and bass drum. In the final minute, Down Beat magazine observed, Mingus bends the "strings with such force that he makes the instrument sound like a cross between a berimbau and a Delta blues guitar". "Fleurette Africaine" is a ballad developed from a simple melody stated on the piano, and features "Mingus's floating bassline and Roach's understated drumming". "Very Special" is another 12-bar blues, possibly improvised. These three compositions, plus "Wig Wise", with its "angular, descending line", were written specifically for this album. On "Caravan", Ellington plays the melody in low octaves, adding "Webern-like notes on the top", imitating an orchestral sound. "Warm Valley" and "Solitude" are ballads, the latter being a piano solo piece until Mingus and Roach enter in the final minute.

The CD releases feature four more compositions: "Switch Blade", "Backward Country Boy Blues", "REM  Blues", and "A Little Max (Parfait)". The last of these is a Latin-influenced track that features Roach. "Switch Blade" is "a slow blues that showcases Mingus's virtuosity with a looseness that puts feeling before precision. [...He] intersperses his basslines with countermelodies and answers to what Duke plays." According to drummer Terri Lyne Carrington, "Backward Country Boy Blues" was probably given its title because part of the usual blues construction is reversed – the V chord precedes the IV chord.

There have been persistent rumors of clashes among the musicians during the session. Douglas's version is that Mingus complained about Roach's playing, then left the studio mid-session, taking his bass with him. Ellington caught up with Mingus on the street outside and persuaded him to return. Ellington's account was slightly different – the reason for Mingus leaving was the same, but he was persuaded to return at the elevator. Another version is that Mingus was upset because Ellington did not use any of Mingus's compositions for the recording. Duke's son, Mercer Ellington, stated that the trio had a contract with United Artists for two albums, but they could not be persuaded to record together again. Critic Thomas Cunniffe suggests that, listening to the tracks in the order in which they were recorded, "one can easily hear the tension building during the uptempo numbers", and that Mingus' temporary departure probably occurred after playing "Money Jungle", which "represents the apex of the group's inner tension, with Mingus plucking the strings with his fingernails, Roach firing up the music with polyrhythms and Ellington laying down highly dissonant chords".

Release history
The original LP was released by United Artists Jazz in 1963 in mono and stereo versions. United Artists was bought by EMI in 1979, and subsidiary Blue Note Records reissued the album on CD in 1987. This contained more recordings from the same session: four previously unreleased works written for the session, plus two alternative takes. The order presented in this edition was that in which the tracks were recorded. The sound quality of the original recording was improved for the 2002 Blue Note CD release by engineer Ron McMaster, using the original tapes and 24-bit remastering, adding clarity to the drums in particular. For this release, the first seven tracks were arranged in their original order, with the other four pieces and four alternative takes placed afterward, increasing the number of tracks to 15.

Reception and influence

Critics
{{Album reviews
|rev1      = AllMusic
|rev1score = 
|rev2 = And It Don't Stop
|rev2Score = A−
|rev3 = The Austin Chronicle
|rev3Score = 
|rev4      = Down Beat
|rev4score = 
|rev5 = Encyclopedia of Popular Music
|rev5Score = 
|rev6      = The Penguin Guide to Jazz
|rev6score = 
|rev7 = Tom Hull – on the Web
|rev7Score = A
}}
Contemporaneous reviews were favorable. The album was awarded the Grand Prix of the Jazz Magazine of France. In a five-star review, Down Beat magazine's Don DeMicheal called Money Jungle "astonishing" and described Roach and Mingus as "some of the fastest company around." He repeatedly praised Mingus for pushing Ellington into new musical territory: "I've never heard Ellington play as he does on this album; Mingus and Roach, especially Mingus, push him so strongly that one can almost hear Ellington show them who's boss – and he dominates both of them, which is no mean accomplishment." Billboard was also positive, describing it as "memorable" for its content as well as "the historical importance of the three playing together".

Much later reviews have been largely positive. Ken Dryden of AllMusic called it a "sensational recording session" and recommended it to "every jazz fan". The Penguin Guide to Jazz claimed that Mingus "completely steals the show", but suggested that the "long-standing Ellington staples" "Caravan" and "Warm Valley" are relatively weak renditions, and that Mingus either did not know the changes or was disgruntled on the latter track. The Financial Times in 2013 described it as "an angular piano-trio masterpiece that [...] confirmed Ellington's inherent modernism". Jay Trachtenberg of The Austin Chronicle praised Ellington's playing and "the modernity of his ideas", and said that the album "stands, more than ever, as a masterful meeting of jazz royalty." Writing of the record's 1986 "remixed and reprogrammed" reissue, Village Voice critic Robert Christgau said "the angular chromaticism and modernist swing of this session relegate most piano-trio records back to the supper clubs."

The sound quality of the original recording has been described as "disappointingly woolly", with "incidents of peaky distortion from the piano microphone". The stereo recording has the piano "up front and center", with the double bass "far to the right channel" and the drums "Strictly in the left channel and slightly behind the piano".

Musicians
Hundreds of musicians have been inspired by the album. Pianist Lafayette Gilchrist states that Money Jungle was the first jazz album that he bought, and that it "sounds like an orchestra being played by a trio. I was inspired to make something [...] big and grandiose just like that". Drummer Jeff "Tain" Watts observed that the members of the trio were "doing their thing, but they’re together", and compares this with later groups led by Keith Jarrett and Wayne Shorter, stating that the later groups "have a much freer way of doing it, but everybody's kind of in their own zone and yet they’re  definitely  playing  the  composition in tune with each other, just like Duke and Max and Mingus were doing on Money Jungle." Trumpeter Miles Davis had a different view of the session: in a 1964 Down Beat blind listening test of the track "Caravan", he criticised the record company for putting the three musicians together, saying that "Max and Mingus can play together, by themselves. Mingus is a hell of a bass player, and Max is a hell of a drummer. But Duke can't play with them, and they can't play with Duke."

Pianists have been impressed by Ellington's playing. Fred Hersch believes that it is one of Ellington's best recordings on piano, as he was forced by the other musicians to improvise in ways beyond what he would normally have played. Matthew Shipp commented on the free elements in the playing, describing the album as "one of the greatest examples of piano playing I've ever heard". John Medeski remarked on the forceful, contrapuntal interaction, facilitated by space. Ethan Iverson commented that, on "Fleurette Africaine", "There's a group dynamic present that's quite amazing. [...] It's a forerunner of The Bad Plus", the trio that he co-founded.

In 1999, the band Rhythm and Brass included Money Jungle tracks on their album More Money Jungle... Ellington Explorations. Drummer Terri Lyne Carrington led the 2013 release Money Jungle: Provocative in Blue'', which includes cover versions of tracks from the original album. Of the compositions premiered on the album, "Fleurette Africaine" and "Wig Wise" are commonly recorded by others.

Track listing
All pieces composed by Duke Ellington, except where stated.

LP (1963 – UAJ)

LP reissue (1986 – Blue Note)

CD (1987 – Blue Note)
Composers are as above.

CD (2002 – Blue Note)
Composers are as above.

Personnel

Musicians
 Duke Ellington – piano
 Charles Mingus – double bass
 Max Roach – drums

Production

1963 LP
Alan Douglas – production
Bill Schwartau – engineering
Frank Gauna – design and photography
George Wein – liner notes

1987 CD
Michael Cuscuna – reissue production
Malcolm Addey – remix engineering

2002 CD
Michael Cuscuna – reissue production
Ron McMaster – remix/remastering engineering

References

External links 
 

1963 albums
Albums produced by Alan Douglas (record producer)
Blue Note Records albums
Charles Mingus albums
Collaborative albums
Duke Ellington albums
Max Roach albums
Post-bop albums
Solid State Records (jazz label) albums
United Artists Records albums